Gusmano Cesaretti (born July 24, 1944) is a self-taught Italian photographer and artist born in Porcari (Lucca), Italy to Bruno Cesaretti and Delfa Cesaretti. He has also worked in films as a producer and visual consultant. He is one of the first photographers to document the East Los Angeles street culture, and has produced photojournalistic works in locations around the world including North, Central, and South America, Southeast Asia, China, Africa, and the Midwest.

Los Angeles Street Life
Cesaretti is known for his photo documentations of Los Angeles lifestyles, the Klique car club, Chicano street barrio culture, and LA gang life.

Other Locations
Cesaretti created series of photographs in Cuba, Bolivia, Panama, Brazil, Mexico, China, Thailand, Lebanon, Israel, Africa, and Chicago's South Side and Cabrini–Green Housing Project. These photographic studies are documented on his web site.

Curator and Publisher 
Cesaretti has curated many exhibitions, starting with his gallery Cityscape Foto Gallery, which he founded in Pasadena, California in 1977. He was instrumental in arranging the exhibition of several major works by Los Angeles street artists in the Los Angeles Museum of Contemporary Art's blockbuster 2011 Art in the Streets show, including the Chosen Few MC motorcycle club. In 2014 he started publishing Los Angeles FOTOFOLIO, an underground journal of black and white photography by well-known and emerging photographers that is distributed free of charge in Los Angeles, New York, Paris, London, and Mexico City.

Books and Exhibitions 
Cesaretti's photographs have appeared in many books and magazines as well as several artist monographs, including Street Writers (published by Acrobat Books, 1975), 5 x 5 = 24 (published by xx, 1979), Fragments of Los Angeles (published by Damian/Alleged Press, 2013), and Dentro le Mura (published by Arte Povera, 2014). His work has been exhibited at the Huntington Library, the Los Angeles Museum of Contemporary Art, and the Smithsonian Institution.

Work in films
Cesaretti has worked closely with film directors Michael Mann, Tony Scott, and Marc Forster, to create the look and feel of many feature films, including Last of the Mohicans, The Insider, Public Enemies, The Taking of Pelham 123, Quantum of Solace, Collateral, Heat, Miami Vice, Manhunter, and Ali.

Personal

Gusmano has been married to Rosa Cesaretti since 1984. They have a son, Vasco Cesaretti.  Gusmano has a daughter, Tosca Cesaretti, from a previous marriage.  He also has a sister, Manuela Cesaretti.

Notes

External links 
 
 https://web.archive.org/web/20090527000938/http://italia.radio6.nl/category/chet-baker/ : Cesaretti discussing Chet Baker's prison experience in Lucca

1946 births
Living people
Artists from Lucca
American photographers
Italian photographers
Italian emigrants to the United States